The following are lists of planets.


In the Solar System

For a list of geophysical planets in the Solar System, see: List of gravitationally rounded objects of the Solar System This also includes a list of the eight planets according to the IAU definition.
For a list of objects in the Solar System once but no longer generally considered planets, see: List of former planets
For a list of objects in the Solar System, including planets, that have been or are believed to exist, but either have not been proven or have been disproven, see: List of hypothetical Solar System objects

Outside the Solar System

 Exoplanets
 
 List of nearest exoplanets
 List of proper names of exoplanets

Extrasolar systems
 List of multiplanetary systems
 List of exoplanets discovered using the Kepler space telescope
 List of stars with proplyds
 List of rogue planets

Exoplanets by method of detection
 List of exoplanets detected by radial velocity
 List of transiting exoplanets
 List of exoplanets detected by microlensing
 List of directly imaged exoplanets
 List of exoplanets detected by timing

Records in exoplanet detection
 List of exoplanet extremes
 List of exoplanet firsts

Potential terrestrial exoplanets
 List of nearest terrestrial exoplanet candidates
 List of potentially habitable exoplanets

Fictional or non-scientific planets
For a list of planets as used in astrology, see: Planets in astrology
For a list of supposed planets not based on scientific evidence, see: Planetary objects proposed in religion, astrology, ufology and pseudoscience
For a list of planets in fiction, see: Planets in science fiction, Stars and planetary systems in fiction and Fictional planets of the Solar System

Mixed
List of planet types (etymologically accepting of multiple categories)

See also
 Lists of astronomical objects
 Classical planet
 Definition of planet
 List of exoplanet search projects